St. Thomas Church is a Catholic church located in the city of Brownsville, Texas. The church is currently a mission of the Immaculate Conception Cathedral which is also in Brownsville.

External links
Roman Catholic Diocese of Brownsville

Buildings and structures in Brownsville, Texas
Roman Catholic churches in Texas
Churches in Cameron County, Texas